Giorgos Mazonakis (born 4 March 1972) is a modern folk-pop and Greek pop singer.

Biography
Giorgos Mazonakis born and raised in the neighbourhood of Nikaia, Athens. He grew up listening to the traditional folk songs of Stratos Dionysiou, Yiannis Parios, Marinella and Haris Alexiou. Very quickly, at the age of 15, he realized his desire to become a singer. The first time he sang at a nightclub was in Patras, in the summer of 1992 and he was discovered by executives of PolyGram Greece.

Giorgos Mazonakis' temperament, his unique interpretation and innovative views, changed the way of nightlife, with highly successful appearances at all the known nightclubs in Athens.

At the same time, Mazonakis has made many appearances throughout Greece, Cyprus, Germany, Australia, and in several U.S. states including: New York City, New Jersey, Atlantic City, and Chicago. Also one of his best hits was released in Italy giving to the huge the success the song had there, "Mou Leipeis" (I miss you) was used in a car ad campaign.

In 2002, the popular singer sang two songs of Stamatis Kraounakis on the soundtrack of the film by Nikos Panagiotopoulos titled Varethika Na Skotono tous Agapitikous Sou (I'm tired of killing your Boyfriends).

Mazonakis and Greek fashion house Deux Hommes collaborated at MadWalk by Vodafone. The Hurriyet, the largest circulation newspaper in Turkey, chose the nightclub Votanikos and George Mazonakis to present the nightlife of Athens. Mazonakis completed his appearances at Votanikos in March 2011 and visited Turkey after preparing a collaboration with a Turkish songwriter, continuing the cooperation that began with major Turkish songwriters in his latest album titled Ta Isia Anapoda.

Discography

Studio albums

Compilation albums

Live albums

Singles

References

External links

On MySpace

1972 births
Living people
20th-century Greek male singers
21st-century Greek male singers
Musicians from Piraeus
Singers from Athens
Greek laïko singers
Heaven Music artists
MAD Video Music Awards winners
Universal Music Greece artists